Robert Leo "Bob" Hulseman (April 5, 1932 – December 21, 2016) was an American businessman and entrepreneur who was best known as the inventor of the red solo cup, which is produced by his family's company, Solo Cup Company. He also co-designed the Traveler Lid, which prevents foam from hot beverages such as lattes and cappuccinos from touching the drinker's nose, now widely used by Starbucks and other brands. Hulseman joined the staff of The Solo Cup Company, which had been founded in 1936 by his father Leo Hulseman, when he was 18 years old. Hulseman spent more than 60 years at the Solo Cup Company, including as the company's President and CEO from 1980 until 2006.

Hulseman developed and introduced the red solo cup, which crucial product of the Solo Cup Company and a part of everyday life for many Americans. The cup became an icon of college and tailgate parties and an essential element in popular drinking games, including beer pong. The red cup was further popularized by Toby Keith's 2011 hit single, "Red Solo Cup".

Biography

Early and personal life
Hulseman was born in Chicago, Illinois, on April 5, 1932. His mother, Dorothy (née Hall), was a singer known by the stage name Dora Hall, while his father, Leo Hulseman, established the Solo Cup Company, a manufacturer of disposable cups, bowls and plates, in 1936. Robert Hulseman survived polio as a teenager, which left one of his legs shorter than the other, which was surgically corrected, and affected the left side of his body.

He met his wife, Sheila, with whom he had ten children, while both were students at Marquette University. He also briefly served in the United States Army.

Career
His father, Leo Hulseman, a former Dixie Cup employee, had founded the Solo Cup Company in 1936. Robert Hulseman joined his father's company as a factory worker when he was 18-years old and worked his way through a series of jobs. Hulseman later developed the Solo Cup Company's plastic business, which would lead to the development of the plastic red solo cup during the 1970s.

Robert Hulseman created the solo cup during the mid-1970s and utilized his own children and family as a focus group. Hulseman would place small plastic cups of varying colors on his kitchen table for his kids to peruse, including blue, red, peach and yellow. While the peach cups were not a hit, the red solo cups proved popular with both his children and consumers. Hulseman, himself, favored blue solo cups.

Husleman initially launched the red solo cups in smaller 5, 7 and 9 ounce sizes. However, he eventually introduced the iconic 16 ounce red solo cup, which proved to be the most popular size long term. When the 16 ounce red cups were first sold, very few consumers drank beers that size. However, consumer tastes changed to match the size of the popular plastic cups. Today, the plastic solo cups are manufactured in dozens of colors, but the red solo cups remain the company's best seller.

Hulseman became President of the Solo Cup Company, which he inherited from his father, in 1980, succeeding his father. He later became the company's CEO as well.

In 1986, Hulseman and his employee, Jack Clements, developed the Traveler Lid for use on coffee cups and other hot beverage containers. The Traveler Lid provides space for foam or whipped cream for hot drinks, such as cappuccinos and lattes, and prevents the foam from reaching the consumer's nose. While both Clements and Hulseman designed the lid, Clements retains the rights to its patent. The Museum of Modern Art (MoMA) in New York City honored the Traveler Lid as part of its 122 "Humble Masterpieces" of design exhibition in 2004.

He retired as CEO in 2006, two years after the family company had acquired rival Sweetheart Cup Company, another manufacturer of disposable cups.

Hulseman was also a devout Catholic and a philanthropist, known to support anti-poverty initiatives and Catholic schools. He and his family attended Mass weekly at Saints Faith, Hope and Charity Roman Catholic Church in Winnetka, Illinois.

The Solo Cup Company was acquired by the Dart Container Corporation in 2012.

Hulseman's health deteriorated during his later years following a series of strokes. He died from stroke complications at his home in Northfield, Illinois, on December 21, 2016, at the age of 84. He was survived by nine children and 30 grandchildren. His wife, Sheila, whom he had been married to for 60 years, died in August 2015 and one of his children, Jean Hulseman Kloos, died in August 2016.

Country singer Toby Keith paid tribute to Hulseman on Twitter, writing, "Raise one for this good man today."

References

2016 deaths
American chief executives
20th-century American inventors
Philanthropists from Illinois
Marquette University alumni
People with polio
People from Northfield, Illinois
1932 births
Catholics from Illinois
20th-century American philanthropists